Pylaia (Greek: Πυλαία) is a village in the municipal unit of Feres, in the southern part of the Evros regional unit, northeastern Greece. In 2011 its population was 79 for the village, and 148 for the community, including the villages Melia and Koila. It is located 6 km northwest of Feres and northeast of Alexandroupoli.

See also

List of settlements in the Evros regional unit

External links
Melia on GTP Travel Pages

References

Populated places in Evros (regional unit)